Burder is a surname. Notable people with the surname include:

George Burder (1752–1832), English divine
Henry Forster Burder (1783–1864), English minister
Thomas Harrison Burder (1789–1843), English physician and author

See also
Burger (surname)